
Year 136 BC was a year of the pre-Julian Roman calendar. At the time it was known as the Year of the Consulship of Philus and Serranus (or, less frequently, year 618 Ab urbe condita) and the Fifth Year of Jianyuan. The denomination 136 BC for this year has been used since the early medieval period, when the Anno Domini calendar era became the prevalent method in Europe for naming years.

Events 
 By place 
 China 
 Confucianism is adopted as the state religion in China by the emperor Emperor Wu.

 Greece 
 Carneades retires as head of the Platonic Academy and is replaced by Polemarchus of Nicomedia.

 Judaea 
 Simon Thassi defeats an invasion by the Seleucid general Cendebaeus.

Rome
 Censorship of Appius Claudius Pulcher and Quintus Fulvius Nobilior
Spain
 The Romans hand Gaius Hostilius Mancinus over to the Numantians in order to repudiate his peace treaty with them.

Births

Deaths

References